("The mother is always certain") is a Roman-law  principle which has the power of , meaning that no counter-evidence can be made against this principle (literally: presumption of law and by law). It provides that the mother of the child is conclusively established, from the moment of birth, by the mother's role in the birth. 

Since egg donation, or embryo donation with surrogacy, started using the technique of in-vitro fertilization, the principle of  has been shaken, since a child may have a genetic and a gestational ("birth"), let alone a "social", mother who are different individuals. Since then some countries have converted the old natural law to an equivalent codified law; in 1997 Germany introduced paragraph 1571  ("motherhood") of the BGB (civil code) reading  ("the mother of a child is the woman who gave birth to it"). This has also been tested in the British case of Freddy McConnell.

Essentially paternity fraud had originally been a marriage fraud in the civil code due to this principle. Today some married fathers use the modern tools of DNA testing to ensure a certainty on their fatherhood.

See also 
 Lydia Fairchild, a woman whose DNA tests seemed to imply she was not the mother of the child she just gave birth to.
 Partus sequitur ventrem
 Matrilineality

Notes

References

Legal doctrines and principles
Legal rules with Latin names
Paternity
Roman law